Eneida de León is a Uruguayan architect and politician.

De León was chairwoman of SODRE. She was also in charge of the restoration of the Solís Theatre and of the final stages of construction of the Adela Reta National Auditorium.

A member of the Broad Front, she serves as Minister of Housing in the government of Tabaré Vázquez.

References 

Uruguayan people of Spanish descent
Uruguayan architects
Broad Front (Uruguay) politicians
Women government ministers of Uruguay
Ministers of Housing, Territorial Planning and Environment of Uruguay
Living people
1943 births